Ben Jones (born 14 March 1972) is a British actor and writer. He is known for playing Dr. Greg Robinson in the BBC One daytime soap opera Doctors. Jones has also written several episodes of the show.

He is the brother of novelist Vanessa Jones and the son of Noël Jones, late Bishop of Sodor and Man. He currently lives in Brighton.

Jones holds an MA in screenwriting (Distinction) from Falmouth University.

Jones is a keen cricket fan and a member of the Lord's Taverners.

He has been a member of the Leukaemia Research celebrity running team since 2005 and has completed 5 London Marathons and several shorter races for the charity, including: The Great North, The Great South, The Fleet Half marathon and The BUPA London and Great Manchester 10ks.

Filmography

External links

1972 births
Living people
Alumni of the University of Reading
British male actors of South Asian descent
British male soap opera actors
British male stage actors
People educated at Harrow School